A. Wade Kach (born July 19, 1947) is an American politician and member of the Baltimore County Council.

Background
Wade Kach is a member of the Baltimore County Council, representing the Third District. He won with over 60% of the vote in both the primary and general elections in 2014, unseating incumbent Councilman Todd Huff (R) and defeating Laurie Taylor-Mitchell (D). In 2018, Kach was re-elected to the Council.

Member of the Maryland House of Delegates representing District 5B, which is part of Baltimore County, MD for 40 years up to 2014.  He won 98.9% of the vote in 2006 while running unopposed.  In 2002 he defeated Democrat Stephen C. Kirsh and Independent William T. Newton with 71.2% of the vote in the new 5B District.

From 1994 to 2002, his district was 9A, which he represented with fellow Republican Martha Scanlan Klima.  Again, they both defeated Stephen C. Kirsch.
Prior to 1994, Kach represented District 10 in Baltimore County along with former governor Robert Ehrlich.
Before the 1994 election, District 10 was represented by Kach, Ehrlich, and former gubernatorial candidate Ellen Sauerbrey.

Education
Growing up, Kach attended public schools in Baltimore City, including Baltimore Polytechnic Institute.  He began college at Towson University beforing settling at Western Maryland College (now McDaniel College), where he received his B.A. in 1970. Early on, Kach began to work for his conservative principles, chairing the Maryland Federation of College Republicans in 1970.

Career

Kach started his career as a middle school math teacher in Baltimore County Public Schools. After 22 years in the classroom, he transitioned into the Audit Office of the school system, reviewing the spending of all schools in the County.

He was a member of the Republican State Central Committee in Baltimore City from 1970-73.
He was first elected as a member of the Maryland House of Delegates in 1975.  Since then, he was elected as a delegate to the Republican Party National Convention in 1988 and 2000.

Active in his community, Kach is a member of the Timonium Optimists, the North Baltimore County Republican and Civic Organization, and the Ashland Community Organization. Kach is also a past member Parents Anonymous of Maryland, the Reisterstown-Owings Mills-Glyndon Coordinating Council, and the Reisterstown-Owings Mills-Glyndon Chamber of Commerce.

He has received many honors including an award from the Maryland Society of Accountants in 1999 and the Casper R. Taylor, Jr., Founder's Award, from the House of Delegates in 2006 and, in 2017, the Thomas Kennedy Award for personal courage and dedication.

In elected office for over 48 years, Kach is the longest serving Republican elected official in Maryland History.

Election results
2006 Race for Maryland House of Delegates – District 5B
Voters to choose one:
{| class="wikitable"
|-
!Name
!Votes
!Percent
!Outcome
|-
|-
|Wade Kach, Rep.
|15,321
|  98.9%
|   Won
|-
|Other Write-Ins
|172
|  1.1%
|   Lost
|}

2002 Race for Maryland House of Delegates – District 5B
Voters to choose one:
{| class="wikitable"
|-
!Name
!Votes
!Percent
!Outcome
|-
|-
|Wade Kach, Rep.
|13,122
|  71.2%
|   Won
|-
|-
|Stephen C. Kirsch, Dem.
|5,268
|  28.6%
|   Lost
|-
|William T. Newton, Ind.
|31
|  0.2%
|   Lost
|-
|Other Write-Ins
|17
|  0.1%
|   Lost
|}

1998 Race for Maryland House of Delegates – District 9A
Voters to choose two:
{| class="wikitable"
|-
!Name
!Votes
!Percent
!Outcome
|-
|-
|Wade Kach, Rep.
|18,382
|  38%
|   Won
|-
|-
|Martha Scanlan Klima, Rep.
|19,190
|  40%
|   Won
|-
|-
|Stephen C. Kirsch, Dem.
|10,584
|  22%
|   Lost
|}

1994 Race for Maryland House of Delegates – District 9A
Voters to choose two:
{| class="wikitable"
|-
!Name
!Votes
!Percent
!Outcome
|-
|-
|Wade Kach, Rep.
|18,734
|  36%
|   Won
|-
|-
|Martha Scanlan Klima, Rep.
|19,927
|  38%
|   Won
|-
|-
|Shelley Buckingham, Dem.
|7,829
|  15%
|   Lost
|-
|-
|Raymond A. Huber, Dem.
|5,823
|  11%
|   Lost
|}

References and notes

External links
 http://www.msa.md.gov/msa/mdmanual/06hse/html/msa12250.html
 http://www.elections.state.md.us/elections/2006/results/general/office_House_of_Delegates.html

1947 births
Living people
Western Maryland College alumni
Republican Party members of the Maryland House of Delegates
People from Baltimore County, Maryland
Politicians from Baltimore
Towson University alumni
21st-century American politicians
County commissioners in Maryland